de Bonstetten is a surname. Notable people with the surname include:

Charles Victor de Bonstetten (1745–1832), Swiss writer 
Walther de Bonstetten (1867–1949), Swiss mountain-guide